Snow White: The Sequel - Special Edition is a 2007 Belgian/French/British adult animated comedy film directed by Picha. It is based on the fairy tale of Snow White and intended as a sequel to Disney's classic animated adaptation. However, like all of Picha's cartoons, the film is actually a sex comedy featuring a lot of bawdy jokes and sex scenes.

Synopsis
Prince Charming was supposed to live long and happily with Snow White after kissing her back to life. However the jealous 'good' fairy decides that she and the prince were meant to be, only the start of a whole series of perversions of various fairy tale characters' traditional good nature. The bad dwarfs (Horny, Grungy, Scumy, Filth, Funky, Spotty and Mental) suddenly become a greedy, blackmailing loan shark syndicate. Sleeping Beauty is now a hypocritical, overly virtuous, selfish Princess. Cinderella's case is more than just a 'rags to riches' story. 
The Prince must figure out how to deal with all of these problems and more to get back to his sweet, innocent, uncomplicated Snow White.

Cast

Original French Version
Cécile De France - Blanche-Neige / La Belle au Bois dormant / Cendrillon
Jean-Paul Rouve - Le Prince charmant
Marie Vincent - La Bonne fée
Jean-Claude Donda - Les sept nains / Le grand Veneur
Gérard Surugue - Les sept nains (voice)
Benoît Allemane - Narrateur (voice)
Marc Alfos - L'ogre (voice)
François Barbin - La Bête
Mona Walravens - La Belle
Anaïs - Blanche-Neige (singing voice)
Sasha Supera - Tom Pouce

Original English Version
Stephen Fry - The Narrator
Sally Ann Marsh - Snow White
Jackie Sheridan - Singing voice of Snow White
Simon Greenall as Prince Charming
Rik Mayall - The Bad Seven Dwarves (Horny, Grungy, Funky, Scummy, Spotty, Filth, and Mental)
Michael Kilgarriff - Hannibal the Ogre
Shelley Blond - Cinderella
Lia Williams - Sleeping Beauty
Morwenna Banks - The Good Fairy
Robert Bathurst, Philip Bretherton, David Carling, April Ford, Tom George, Sarah Hadland, Vicki Hopps, Simon Schatzberger and Jimmy Hibbert as additional voices.

External links

2007 comedy films
2007 films
French
Belgian animated fantasy films
Films directed by Picha
French animated fantasy films
2000s French animated films
Polish animated fantasy films
2000s French-language films
Films based on Snow White
Fairy tale parody films
Belgian sex comedy films
British sex comedy films
French sex comedy films
Disney parodies
Belgian satirical films
British satirical films
French satirical films
British adult animated films
French adult animated films
2000s British films